Jakob Jantscher (born 8 January 1989) is an Austrian professional footballer who plays as a winger or striker for Austrian Bundesliga club Sturm Graz and the Austria national team.

Club career
Born in Graz, Jantscher started his career at SC Unterpremstätten und LUV Graz in the Styrian league and 2003 at the age of 14 he moved on to Sturm Graz. On 20 October 2007, he gave his debut in the first team coming on for Thomas Krammer in a match against Red Bull Salzburg. He scored his first goal on 24 November 2007 in a match against SCR Altach.

On 3 June 2010, Jantscher signed with FC Red Bull Salzburg for four years. On 6 September 2012, he joined Dynamo Moscow on one-year loan deal, while Dynamo Moscow secured an option to sign him permanently, which they choose not to.

On 1 September 2013, Jantscher signed for Dutch Eredivisie club NEC Nijmegen, where he stayed only one season as the club was relegated at the end of the season.

On 24 June 2016, he made a transfer to Turkish side Çaykur Rizespor.

On 9 May 2018, he played as Sturm Graz beat Red Bull Salzburg in extra time to win the 2017–18 Austrian Cup.

International career
Jantscher played five times for the Austria national football team, under-19 and under-20, and twice for Austria U21. His made his debut for Austria on 6 June 2009 in a 2010 FIFA World Cup qualification against Serbia. His first goal was in a friendly match against Spain, where he scored the only goal for Austria in a 5–1 defeat. He represented the national team at 2016 UEFA Euro.

Career statistics

International goals

Scores and results list Austria's goal tally first, score column indicates score after each Jantscher goal.

Honours
Red Bull Salzburg
 Austrian Football Bundesliga: 2012
 Austrian Cup: 2012

Sturm Graz
 Austrian Cup: 2010, 2018

Individual
 Austrian Bundesliga Player of the Year: 2021–22
 Austrian Bundesliga Top assist provider: 2021–22
 Austrian Bundesliga Team of the Year: 2021–22

References

External links
 
 
 Voetbal International profile 
 

Living people
1989 births
Association football midfielders
Association football forwards
Austrian footballers
Austria international footballers
UEFA Euro 2016 players
Austrian Football Bundesliga players
Russian Premier League players
Eredivisie players
Swiss Super League players
Süper Lig players
SK Sturm Graz players
FC Red Bull Salzburg players
FC Dynamo Moscow players
NEC Nijmegen players
FC Luzern players
Çaykur Rizespor footballers
Austrian expatriate footballers
Austrian expatriate sportspeople in Russia
Expatriate footballers in Russia
Austrian expatriate sportspeople in the Netherlands
Expatriate footballers in the Netherlands
Austrian expatriate sportspeople in Switzerland
Expatriate footballers in Switzerland
Austrian expatriate sportspeople in Turkey
Expatriate footballers in Turkey
Footballers from Graz